Tibor Zádor was a Hungarian diplomat, who served as Hungarian Charge d'Affaires ad interim to the United States following the Hungarian Revolution of 1956, when the Cabinet of the United States did not recognise the Kádár government which was installed after the Soviet invasion of Hungary.

Zádor's main task was to restore and normalize the frozen relationship between the two countries. He enjoyed a high degree of autonomy during these years.

References

Sources

External links
Diplomatic Representation for Hungary

Ambassadors of Hungary to the United States
Possibly living people
Year of birth missing